Syaqiera binti Mashayikh (born 24 November 2000 Segamat, Johor)  is a Malaysian archer. She qualified for the 2020 Summer Olympics, became the third Malaysian woman archer to feature in the Olympics after Mon Redee Sut Txi in Athens 2004 and Nurul Syafiqah Hashim in London 2012.

She competed at the 2021 Archery World Cup.

References 

Living people
Malaysian female archers
2000 births
Olympic archers of Malaysia
Archers at the 2020 Summer Olympics
People from Johor
Competitors at the 2021 Southeast Asian Games
Southeast Asian Games medalists in archery
Southeast Asian Games silver medalists for Malaysia
Southeast Asian Games bronze medalists for Malaysia